Ivan Bakulin may refer to
 Ivan Bakulin (diplomat) (1906–1963), ambassador of the Soviet Union to Afghanistan from 1943 to 1947
 Ivan Bakulin (footballer) (born 1986), Russian footballer
 Ivan Bakulin (partisan) (1900–1942), Hero of the Soviet Union